Cheshmeh Hajegah Jafari (also Romanized as Cheshmeh Ḩājegah Jaʿfarī; also known as Cheshmeh Ḩājegah and Cheshmeh Jājgah) is a village in Gowavar Rural District, Govar District, Gilan-e Gharb County, Kermanshah Province, Iran. At the 2006 census, its population was 483, in 100 families.

References 

Populated places in Gilan-e Gharb County